Faggot is a Canadian short drama film, directed by Olivier Perrier and released in 2016.

The film centres on Alex Girard (Robin L'Houmeau), a young junior hockey player in the Abitibi-Témiscamingue region of Quebec who is struggling with whether to come out as gay to his teammates.

Perrier, a film student at Concordia University at the time of making the film, won the Emerging Canadian Artist award at the 2017 Inside Out Film and Video Festival.

References

External links

2016 films
Canadian ice hockey films
Canadian LGBT-related short films
LGBT-related sports drama films
2016 LGBT-related films
Canadian sports drama films
French-language Canadian films
Canadian drama short films
2010s Canadian films